The Death of a Composer is a series of ten opera libretti by Peter Greenaway dealing with the deaths of ten 20th-century composers from Anton Webern to John Lennon.  All ten composers left behind ten common clues related to their deaths.  Greenaway was interested in this commonality and explored this in the operas, each written or to be written by a different composer.  Louis Andriessen finished Rosa - A Horse Drama in 1995.  Geoffrey Fallthius is a fictional character from Greenaway's The Falls, a pupil of Tulse Luper.  Indeed, aside from Webern and Lennon, all of the composers are fictitious.

Anton Webern 1945 
Samuel Bucket 1948
Tora Arcadio 1951 
Portala Zick 1952 
Antonio Marseil 1955 
Juan Manuel de Rosa 1957 
Erik Butlitzer 1961 
Geoffrey Fallthuis 1968 
Corntopia Felixchange 1974 
John Lennon 1980

Opera libretti
Peter Greenaway